Maaouya Ould Sid'Ahmed Taya (born 28 November 1941) is a Mauritanian military officer who served as the President of Mauritania from 1984 to 2005. 

Having come to power through a bloodless military coup, he was ousted by a military coup himself in 2005. Prior to his presidency, he was the 5th Prime Minister of Mauritania between 1981 to 1992 (except for a brief period in 1984).

Early years

Born in the town of Atar (Adrar Region), Ould Taya attended a Franco-Arabic Primary School from 1949 to 1955. He then attended Rosso High School in southern Mauritania. After graduation, he attended a French military school in 1960 and graduated as an officer the next year. In 1975, he received strategic training at the French War Academy. In 1978, the Mauritanian army seized power and ousted President Moktar Ould Daddah, in an attempt to forestall government collapse in the war over Western Sahara against the Polisario Front (1975–79). Ould Taya was among the conspirators, and quickly gained influence within the government.

President of Mauritania (1984-2005)
After holding various positions in the military, Ould Taya was appointed Chief of Staff of the Army in January 1981, during the rule of military head of state Mohamed Khouna Ould Haidalla. In the aftermath of a failed coup against Ould Haidalla in March 1981, Ould Taya was appointed Prime Minister on 25 April 1981, replacing civilian prime minister Sid Ahmed Ould Bneijara. He held this office until 8 March 1984, when Ould Haidalla, who was still head of state, took over the post. On 12 December 1984, while Ould Haidalla was out of the country, Ould Taya seized power and declared himself Chairman of the Military Committee for National Salvation.

President Ould Taya freed all prisoners and dissolved ALHYAKEL (people’s education committee) and sought from his arrival the establishment of a nation of law and order. He organized the first democratic election in the nation’s 26 years of existence in 1986.

Transition to democracy 
Ould Taya's regime began a transition to civilian, multiparty government in 1991; a new constitution was approved by referendum in July. The first multiparty presidential elections were held in January 1992. Ould Taya, candidate of the newly formed Democratic and Social Republican Party (PRDS), received nearly 63% of the vote amid opposition claims of serious irregularities and fraud. He won slightly more than 90% of the vote in the 12 December 1997 presidential election, which was boycotted by major opposition political parties; anticipating fraud, they said that this would make their participation futile.

Political instability
The last years of Ould Taya's rule were marred by unrest within the military and hostility between the regime and the country's Islamists. Ould Taya also moved away from his support of the Iraqi regime of Saddam Hussein at the time of the 1991 Gulf War, and moved towards the West. In late 1999, Mauritania established full diplomatic relations with Israel, becoming only the third Arab country to do so. In doing so, he had at some point formally ended a declared war on Israel that dated from the 1967 Six-Day War. Ould Taya's close ties with Israel and the United States served to deepen the opposition to his rule.
In June 2003, Ould Taya's government survived a coup attempt, defeating rebel soldiers after two days of fighting in the capital, Nouakchott; the coup leader, Saleh Ould Hanenna, initially escaped capture. Ould Hanenna announced the formation of a rebel group called the Knights of Change, but was eventually captured in 2004 and sentenced to life in prison along with other alleged plotters in early 2005. On 7 November 2003 a presidential election was held, which was won by Ould Taya with over 67% of the vote.  The opposition again denounced the result as fraudulent; the second place candidate, former ruler Ould Haidalla, was arrested both immediately before and after the election, and was accused of plotting a coup. In August 2004, the government arrested more alleged coup plotters, who it said had planned to overthrow Ould Taya when he took a planned trip to France; some, however, doubted the existence of this plot and suspected that it was a pretext for a crackdown. In late September, the government claimed to have thwarted yet another plot to oust Ould Taya.

Anticipating an increase in government revenue through the exploitation of natural resources, particularly offshore oil deposits, Ould Taya announced an increase in pay for the civil service and pensions in November 2004.

Fall from power

While Ould Taya was out of the country for the funeral of Saudi king Fahd in early August 2005, soldiers seized government buildings and the state media. The group, which identified itself as the Military Council for Justice and Democracy, announced a coup d'état in a statement run by the state news agency on 3 August: "The armed forces and security forces have unanimously decided to put an end to the totalitarian practices of the deposed regime under which our people have suffered much over the last several years."

The new military dictatorship said it would remain in power for a maximum of two years to allow time for democratic institutions to be implemented. The Military Council for Justice and Democracy named Col. Ely Ould Mohamed Vall, a top associate of Ould Taya for many years, as its head.Ould Taya, on his way back from Fahd's funeral, landed in Niamey, the capital of Niger. He met Niger's president Mamadou Tandja before going to a villa in Niamey. Speaking to Radio France Internationale on 5 August, Ould Taya condemned the coup, saying that there had "never been a more senseless coup in Africa" and that it reminded him of the adage "God save me from my friends, I'll take care of my enemies". On 8 August, he unsuccessfully attempted to order the armed forces to restore him to power. Broad support for the coup appeared to exist across the country; Ould Taya's own PRDS party abandoned him a few days after the coup by endorsing the new regime's transitional plan. International reaction to Ould Taya's overthrow was initially strongly hostile, including the suspension of Mauritania from the African Union, but after several days the new rulers were apparently diplomatically successful in winning tacit international acceptance of their transitional regime. The United States in particular at first called for Ould Taya to be restored to power but subsequently backed away from this.

After presidency 
He left Niger for Banjul, Gambia on 9 August 2005. After nearly two weeks there, he and his family flew to Qatar, where they arrived on 22 August.

In April 2006, Vall said that Ould Taya could return home as a free citizen, but would not be allowed to take part in the elections that were to mark the end of the transition because, Vall said, his participation could disrupt the transitional process; however, Vall said that he would be able to return to politics after the completion of the transition.

In the March 2007 presidential election, Ould Taya is said to have favoured former central bank Governor Zeine Ould Zeidane.

In late 2013, Ould Taya was appointed a teacher at the Ahmed Bin Mohammad Military School, which is a military Academy in Qatar.

References

1941 births
Living people
People from Adrar Region
Mauritanian Muslims
Mauritanian Sunni Muslims
Leaders who took power by coup
Leaders ousted by a coup
Mauritanian military personnel
Republican Party for Democracy and Renewal politicians
Heads of state of Mauritania